Frank Menechino (born January 7, 1971) is an American former professional baseball infielder and most recently the hitting coach for the Chicago White Sox of Major League Baseball (MLB). He played in MLB for the Oakland Athletics and Toronto Blue Jays from 1999 through 2005.

Playing career
Menechino played baseball at Susan E. Wagner High School in New York. He played college baseball at Gulf Coast Community College in Panama City, Florida, before transferring to the University of Alabama.

Drafted by the Chicago White Sox in the 45th round of the 1993 draft, Menechino played five years for their minor league teams. Notably, he was one of the players who crossed the picket lines to be a replacement player during the 1995 season, if the strike had not ended. Due to this, he was ineligible to join the MLBPA.

He played for the Oakland Athletics and Toronto Blue Jays of the American League. He played second base, shortstop, third base, designated hitter, and also made two pitching appearances. When he pitched for the A's in 2000, it was the last time the A's had a position player pitch until first baseman Ike Davis in 2015. Hitting 12 home runs and driving in 60 runs, his best year came in 2001 with the Oakland Athletics,

In early , Menechino signed a minor league contract with the Cincinnati Reds, but did not make the Major League team out of spring training. On August 17, 2006, Menechino signed a minor league contract with the New York Yankees and was sent to the Triple-A Columbus Clippers where he was a utility man. On February 10, 2007, Menechino signed a minor league contract with the Colorado Rockies. The Rockies released him June 1, 2007, followed by his contract being picked up by the San Diego Padres and being assigned to the Triple-A Portland Beavers on June 9, 2007. He became a free agent at the end of the season.

Coaching career
On December 22, 2008, Menechino was hired to become the new hitting coach for the New York Yankees' Double-A affiliate, the Trenton Thunder.  Menechino coached for the Triple-A Scranton/Wilkes-Barre Yankees in 2011.

Menechino was hired by the Miami Marlins as their hitting coach on October 11, 2013. The Marlins fired him after the 2018 season.

The Chicago White Sox hired Menechino to be the hitting coach of their Triple-A Affiliate, the Charlotte Knights, for the 2019 season. Following the 2019 season, he was promoted to the position of hitting coach for the White Sox. Following the 2022 season, Menechino was fired.

See also
Staten Island Sports Hall of Fame

References

External links

1971 births
Living people
Baseball coaches from New York (state)
American people of Italian descent
American expatriate baseball players in Canada
Alabama Crimson Tide baseball players
Birmingham Barons players
Chicago White Sox coaches
Colorado Springs Sky Sox players
Columbus Clippers players
Edmonton Trappers players
Gulf Coast State Commodores baseball players
Gulf Coast White Sox players
Hickory Crawdads players
Louisville Bats players
Major League Baseball hitting coaches
Major League Baseball replacement players
Major League Baseball second basemen
Miami Marlins coaches
Midland RockHounds players
Nashville Sounds players
Oakland Athletics players
Portland Beavers players
Prince William Cannons players
Sacramento River Cats players
South Bend Silver Hawks players
Sportspeople from Staten Island
Baseball players from New York City
Toronto Blue Jays players
Vancouver Canadians players
2006 World Baseball Classic players
Nettuno Baseball Club players
American expatriate baseball players in Italy